Four Ashes may refer to:

 Four Ashes, Buckinghamshire, England
 Four Ashes, Staffordshire, England
 Four Ashes railway station in Staffordshire, England

See also
 Ashes (disambiguation)
 Ash (disambiguation)